Raeburn is a surname. Notable people with the surname include:

 Agnes Raeburn (1872-1955), Scottish artist
 Anna Raeburn (born 1944), British broadcaster and journalist
 Boyd Raeburn U.S. jazz bandleader and bass saxophonist
 Henry Raeburn (1756–1823), Scottish portrait painter
 Harold Raeburn (1865–1926), British mountaineer
 Julieon Raeburn (born 1978), Trinidadian athlete
 Paul Raeburn, U.S. science writer

See also 
 Raeburn Place, playing fields in Edinburgh, Scotland
 Rayburn (disambiguation)
 Deanna Raybourn
 Michael E. Reiburn (1893–1982), New York politician